

Heart Ache/Dethroned is a double EP release by the Welsh band Jesu. Released on 16 November 2010 through Hydra Head Records, it combines the band's out-of-print, debut 2004 EP Heart Ache with a previously unreleased EP titled Dethroned. Jesu founder, Justin Broadrick, began working on Dethroned around the same time as Heart Ache in 2004, but it was not completed until 2010. Broadrick said the release of Dethroned took so long because he didn't want it to be a stand-alone EP and was waiting for the right album with which to combine it. Broadrick chose a reissue of Heart Ache to pair with Dethroned because they were written around the same period and contained similarities to his previous band, Godflesh. He said, "Both Heart Ache and Dethroned, for me, contain a huge amount of Godflesh to some extent, it's that period when the ghost of Godflesh still somewhat influenced the Jesu sound and songwriting."

Heart Ache/Dethroned scored a 79/100 on Metacritic based on 8 critics, indicating "generally favorable reviews." Thom Jurek of Allmusic gave the album four out of five stars stating that, "What the Dethroned half of this nearly 70-minute set reveals is that Jesu is still breaking new ground. Contrasted with Heart Ache, this new double EP is an excellent introductory portrait of the project, past and present." While Leor Galil of PopMatters gave the album a 6/10 stating that, "Combining a brilliant debut with some never-heard, once-unfinished songs is clearly a move made with diehard Jesu fans in mind. But, for the curious and casual music listeners, it's the record's shorter songs that, oddly enough, are the least listenable."

Track listing
All songs written by Jesu.

Disc 1: Heart Ache
 "Heart Ache" – 19:42
 "Ruined" – 20:14

Disc 2: Dethroned
 "Dethroned" – 7:12
 "Annul" – 7:16
 "Aureated Skin" – 6:46
 "I Can Only Disappoint You" – 7:09

Japanese bonus track
 "I Can Only Disappoint You" (extended dub) – 9:42

Personnel
Heart Ache/Dethroned adapted from CD liner notes.

Jesu
 Justin Broadrick – all instruments, vocals

Production
 Justin Broadrick – production, mixing

Artwork
 Justin Broadrick – photography
 Aaron Turner – design
 Faith Coloccia – photo treatments, design assistance

References

External links
 Heart Ache/Dethroned on Bandcamp

Jesu (band) albums
2010 compilation albums
Hydra Head Records compilation albums